Pandalus (cold-water prawn) is a genus of shrimp in the family Pandalidae. Members of the genus are medium-sized and live on or near the seabed. Some species are the subject of commercial fisheries and are caught by trawling. One species, Pandalus montagui, lives in association with the reef-building polychaete worm, Sabellaria spinulosa.

Their lifespan is typically three to five years, with sexual maturity being reached at an early age. Members of this genus are protandric hermaphrodites, starting life as males and later becoming females. Reproduction takes place in the spring when up to 3,000 eggs are produced and fertilised internally. The female carries them around under the abdomen for about six days before they develop into planktotrophic larvae. These remain in the plankton for four to six months. During this time, they drift with the currents and have a dispersal potential of at least  The shrimp have a rapid growth rate, so populations can build up quite rapidly after disturbance or habitat destruction.

Species
The following extant species are accepted by the World Register of Marine Species:

Pandalus aleuticus (Rathbun, 1902)
Pandalus amplus (Spence Bate, 1888)
Pandalus borealis Krøyer, 1838
Pandalus capillus (Komai & Hibino, 2019)
Pandalus chani Komai, 1999
Pandalus coccinatus (Urita, 1941)
Pandalus curvatus Komai, 1999
Pandalus danae Stimpson, 1857
Pandalus dispar (Rathbun, 1902)
Pandalus eous Makarov, 1935
Pandalus formosanus Komai, 1999
Pandalus gibbus (Komai & Takeda, 2002)
Pandalus glabrus (Kobjakova, 1936)
Pandalus goniurus Stimpson, 1860
Pandalus gracilis Stimpson, 1860
Pandalus gurneyi Stimpson, 1871
Pandalus houyuu (Komai & Hibino, 2019)
Pandalus hypsinotus J.F. Brandt in von Middendorf, 1851
Pandalus ivanovi Komai & Eletskaya, 2008
Pandalus japonicus (Balss, 1914)
Pandalus jordani Rathbun, 1902
Pandalus lamelligerus J.F. Brandt in von Middendorf, 1851
Pandalus latirostris Rathbun, 1902
Pandalus longipes (Komai, 1994)
Pandalus longirostris (Rathbun, 1902)
Pandalus lucidirimicolus (Jensen, 1998)
Pandalus miyakei (Hayashi in Baba, Hayashi & Toriyama, 1986)
Pandalus montagui Leach, 1814
Pandalus multidentatus (Kobjakova, 1936)
Pandalus nipponensis Yokoya, 1933
Pandalus ochotensis (Kobjakova, 1936)
Pandalus pacificus Doflein, 1902
Pandalus platyceros J.F. Brandt in von Middendorf, 1851
Pandalus prensor Stimpson, 1860
Pandalus princeps (Komai & Hibino, 2019)
Pandalus profundus (Zarenkov, 1971)
Pandalus punctatus (Kobjakova, 1936)
Pandalus rubrus (Komai, 1994)
Pandalus spinosior (Hanamura, Khono & Sakaji, 2000)
Pandalus stenolepis Rathbun, 1902
Pandalus teraoi Kubo, 1937
Pandalus tridens Rathbun, 1902
Pandalus zarenkovi (Ivanov & Sokolov, 2001)

One additional species is known from the fossil record.

Commercial fisheries

These species are caught commercially:

Northern shrimp or prawn – Pandalus borealis
Pink (smooth or ocean) shrimp – Pandulus jordani
Flexed or humpy shrimp – Pandalus goniurus
Dock shrimp – Pandalus danae
Humpback shrimp – Pandalus hypsinotus
Pink shrimp – Pandalus montagui
Spot shrimp – Pandalus platyceros

See also
Krill

References

External links

Caridea
Decapod genera